Eriptychiida is an extinct marine taxon of vertebrate in the group Pteraspidomorphi.

The order contains the genus, Eriptychius, and fossilized specimens from this genus have been found in the Gull River Formation of Ontario, the Harding Formation of Colorado, and the Bighorn Dolomite of Wyoming. The group contains two documented species: Eriptychius americanus and Eriptychius orvigi.

Characteristics 
The structure of the dentine of eriptychiids is in many respects closer to that of heterostracans that to that of astraspids. This is the only argument to place them as the closest relatives to heterostracans, among the Ordovician vertebrates. However, eriptychiids differ from all other pteraspidomorphs in having a massively calcified endoskeleton, pervaded by canals for blood vessels.

Taxonomy
 Order †Eriptychiiformes Ørvig 1958
 Genus ?†Eleochera Sansom & Smith 2005
 Family †Eriptychiidae Tarlo 1962
 Genus †Eriptychius Walcott 1892
 Family †Oniscolepididae Märss & Karatajūtė-Talimaa 2009
 Genus †Kallostrakon Lankester 1870
 Genus †Oniscolepis Pander 1856 non Groß 1961 [Strosipherus Pander 1856]}

See also 
 Fish

References

External links 
 Eriptychiida

Pteraspidomorphi
Prehistoric jawless fish orders
Ordovician jawless fish
Late Ordovician animals
Ordovician fish of North America
Late Ordovician first appearances
Late Ordovician taxonomic orders
Late Ordovician extinctions

de:Pteraspidomorphi#Eriptychiida